The Samuel Cobb House is a building in southeast Portland, Oregon, listed on the National Register of Historic Places.

Further reading

See also
 National Register of Historic Places listings in Southeast Portland, Oregon

References

External links
 

1911 establishments in Oregon
Bungalow architecture in Oregon
Houses on the National Register of Historic Places in Portland, Oregon
Mount Tabor, Portland, Oregon
Portland Historic Landmarks